Arthrocereus glaziovii is a species of plant in the family Cactaceae. It is endemic to Brazil.  Its natural habitat is rocky areas. It is threatened by habitat loss.

References

Endemic flora of Brazil
Endangered plants
glaziovii
Taxonomy articles created by Polbot